Mena School District  is a school district in Polk County, Arkansas.

On July 1, 2004, the Hatfield School District was consolidated into the Mena School District.

References

Further reading
 These maps include predecessor districts
 2004-2005 School District Map
 Map of Arkansas School Districts pre-July 1, 2004
 (Download)

External links
 
 
School districts in Arkansas
Education in Polk County, Arkansas